Spanish Eclectic may refer to:

Eclecticism in architecture, a style of architecture
Spanish Eclecticism, a style or painting